Papyrus 70 (in the Gregory-Aland numbering), designated by 𝔓70, is an early copy of the New Testament in Greek. It is a papyrus manuscript of the Gospel of Matthew. The surviving texts of Matthew are verses 2:13-16; 2:22-3:1; 11:26-27; 12:4-5; 24:3-6.12-15. 𝔓70 has a fairly reliable text, though it was carelessly written. 
The manuscript palaeographically had been assigned to the late 3rd century.

 Text 
The Greek text of this codex is a representative of the Alexandrian text-type. Aland ascribed it as a “strict text”, and placed it in Category I.

 Present location
It is currently housed at the Ashmolean Museum (P. Oxy. 2384) in Oxford and at the Papyrological Institute of Florence in National Archaeological Museum (Florence) (PSI 3407 – formerly CNR 419, 420).

See also 

 List of New Testament papyri
 Oxyrhynchus papyri

References

Images 
 Oxyrhynchus 2384
 𝔓70 Matt. 11:26-27
 𝔓70 Matt. 12:4-5

Further reading 

 Edgar Lobel, Colin H. Roberts, E. G. Turner, and J. W. B. Barns, Oxyrhynchus Papyri, XXIV (London: 1957), pp. 4–5.
 M. Naldini, Nuovi frammenti del vangelo di Matteo, Prometeus 1 (Florence: 1975), pp. 195–200.
 

New Testament papyri
3rd-century biblical manuscripts
Early Greek manuscripts of the New Testament
National Archaeological Museum, Florence
Gospel of Matthew papyri